Timely!! is the sixth studio album by Japanese singer Anri.

Overview 
The album was a collaboration between Toshiki Kadomatsu and Anri. It is considered one of Anri's best albums.

The single "Cat's Eye" served as the opening for the 1983 anime series Cat's Eye. It was one of the highest selling singles in Japan in 1983, remaining number-one for five consecutive weeks. The single was re-recorded for the album and was later covered by girl group MAX in 2010.

Track listing 
All lyrics, music, and arrangements were written by Toshiki Kadomatsu except where noted.

References 

1983 albums
Japanese-language albums